This is a list of the mammal species recorded in the Canary Islands, Spain. Since the Osorian shrew (Crocidura osorio) was proven to be actually a population of introduced European greater white-toothed shrew (C. russula) the Canarian shrew, C. canariensis is believed to be the only surviving native terrestrial mammal of the archipelago, every other species now present having been voluntarily or accidentally introduced by humans.

The following tags are used to highlight each species' conservation status as assessed by the International Union for Conservation of Nature.

Subclass: Theria

Infraclass: Eutheria

Order: Rodentia (rodents)

Rodents make up the largest order of mammals, with over 40% of mammalian species. They have two incisors in the upper and lower jaw which grow continually and must be kept short by gnawing.

Suborder: Sciuromorpha
Family: Sciuridae (squirrels)
Subfamily: Xerinae
Genus: Atlantoxerus
 Barbary ground squirrel, A. getulus  introduced
Suborder: Myomorpha
Family: Muridae (mice and rats)
Genus: Canariomys
 Tenerife giant rat, C. bravoi 
 Gran Canaria giant rat, C. tamarani 
Genus: Malpaisomys
 Lava mouse, M. insularis 
Subfamily: Murinae
Genus: Mus
 House mouse, M. musculus  introduced
Genus: Rattus
 Black rat, R. rattus  introduced
 Brown rat, R. norvegicus  introduced

Order: Lagomorphs (lagomorphs)

The lagomorphs comprise two families, Leporidae (hares and rabbits), and Ochotonidae (pikas). Though they can resemble rodents, and were classified as a superfamily in that order until the early 20th century, they have since been considered a separate order. They differ from rodents in a number of physical characteristics, such as having four incisors in the upper jaw rather than two.

Family: Leporidae (rabbits, hares)
Genus: Oryctolagus
European rabbit, O. cuniculus  introduced

Order: Erinaceomorpha (hedgehogs and gymnures)

The order Erinaceomorpha contains a single family, Erinaceidae, which comprise the hedgehogs and gymnures. The hedgehogs are easily recognised by their spines while gymnures look more like large rats.

Family: Erinaceidae (hedgehogs)
Subfamily: Erinaceinae
Genus: Atelerix
 North African hedgehog, A. algirus  introduced

Order: Soricomorpha (shrews, moles, and solenodons)

The "shrew-forms" are insectivorous mammals. The shrews and solenodons closely resemble mice while the moles are stout bodied burrowers.

Family: Soricidae (shrews)
Subfamily: Crocidurinae
Genus: Crocidura
 Canarian shrew, Crocidura canariensis 
 Greater white-toothed shrew, Crocidura russula  introduced
Genus: Suncus
 Etruscan shrew, Suncus etruscus  introduced

Order: Chiroptera (bats)

 

The bats' most distinguishing feature is that their forelimbs are developed as wings, making them the only mammals capable of flight. Bat species account for about 20% of all mammals.

Suborder: Megachiroptera
Family: Pteropodidae (flying foxes, Old World fruit bats)
Genus: Rousettus
 Egyptian fruit bat, Rousettus aegyptiacus  introduced
Suborder: Microchiroptera
Family: Molossidae (free-tailed bats)
Subfamily: Molossinae
Genus: Tadarida
 European free-tailed bat, Tadarida teniotis 
Family: Vespertilionidae (vesper bats)
Subfamily: Vespertilioninae
Genus: Barbastella
 Barbastelle, Barbastella barbastellus 
Genus: Hypsugo
 Savi's pipistrelle, Hypsugo savii 
Genus: Nyctalus
 Lesser noctule, Nyctalus leisleri 
Genus: Pipistrellus
 Kuhl's pipistrelle, Pipistrellus kuhlii 
 Madeira pipistrelle, Pipistrellus maderensis 
Genus: Plecotus
 Canary big-eared bat, Plecotus teneriffae

Order: Cetacea (whales)

The order Cetacea includes whales, dolphins and porpoises. They are the mammals most fully adapted to aquatic life with a spindle-shaped nearly hairless body, protected by a thick layer of blubber, and forelimbs and tail modified to provide propulsion underwater.

Suborder: Mysticeti
Family: Balaenopteridae (rorquals)
Genus: Balaenoptera
 Common minke whale, Balaenoptera acutorostrata 
 Bryde's whale, Balaenoptera edeni 
 Blue whale, Balaenoptera musculus 
 Fin whale, Balaenoptera physalus  vagrant
Genus: Megaptera
 Humpback whale, Megaptera novaeangliae 
Family: Balaenidae
Genus: Eubalaena
 North Atlantic right whale, Eubalaena glacialis 
Suborder: Odontoceti
Family: Delphinidae (dolphins and pilot whales)
Genus: Delphinus
 Short-beaked common dolphin, Delphinus delphis 
Genus: Globicephala
 Short-finned pilot whale, Globicephala macrorhynchus 
 Long-finned pilot whale, Globicephala melas 
Genus: Grampus
 Risso's dolphin, Grampus griseus 
Genus: Lagenodelphis
 Fraser's dolphin, Lagenodelphis hosei 
Genus: Orcinus
 Orca, Orcinus orca 
Genus: Pseudorca
 False killer whale, Pseudorca crassidens 
Genus: Stenella
 Striped dolphin, Stenella coeruleoalba 
 Atlantic spotted dolphin, Stenella frontalis 
Genus: Steno
 Rough-toothed dolphin, Steno bredanensis 
Genus: Tursiops
 Common bottlenose dolphin, Tursiops truncatus 
Family: Kogiidae (small sperm whales)
Genus: Kogia
 Pygmy sperm whale, Kogia breviceps 
 Dwarf sperm whale, Kogia sima 
Family: Physeteridae (sperm whales)
Genus: Physeter
 Sperm whale, Physeter macrocephalus 
Family: Ziphiidae (beaked whales)
Genus: Hyperoodon
 Northern bottlenose whale, Hyperoodon ampullatus 
Genus: Mesoplodon
 Blainville's beaked whale, Mesoplodon densirostris 
 Gervais' beaked whale, Mesoplodon europaeus 
 True's beaked whale, Mesoplodon mirus 
Genus: Ziphius
 Cuvier's beaked whale, Ziphius cavirostris

Order: Artiodactyla (even-toed ungulates)

The even-toed ungulates are ungulates whose weight is borne about equally by the third and fourth toes, rather than mostly or entirely by the third as in perissodactyls. There are about 220 artiodactyl species, including many that are of great economic importance to humans.

Family: Bovidae (cattle, antelope, sheep, goats)
Subfamily: Caprinae
Genus: Ammotragus
 Barbary sheep, Ammotragus lervia  introduced
Genus: Ovis
 European mouflon, Ovis aries introduced

Locally extinct 
The following species are locally extinct in the area but continue to exist elsewhere:
Mediterranean monk seal, Monachus monachus

Notes

References

 Nogales, M. et al. (2006) "Ecological effects and distribution of invasive non-native mammals on the Canary Islands" Mammal Rev. 2006, Volume 36, No. 1, 49–65
 Purroy, F.J. and Varela, J.M. (2003) Guía de los Mamíferos de España. Península, Baleares y Canarias. Lynx Edicions, Barcelona.

See also
List of chordate orders
Lists of mammals by region
List of prehistoric mammals
Mammal classification
List of mammals described in the 2000s

 
Canary Islands
Mammals
Canary Islands